The 2007-08 Libyan Third Division was the 24th edition of the Libyan Third Division football. It took place from November 2007 to June 2008. Wefaq Ajdabiya won the title, having won the championship playoffs between the winners of the regional leagues.

Promotion
The top two clubs in the Sirte, Jabal al Akhdar, Benghazi, Sabha and Misrata regional leagues were promoted to the Libyan Second Division for the 2008-09 season. The top three clubs in the Tripoli regional league were also promoted.

Playoffs

Semifinals
The promotion playoffs took place between the third and fourth placed teams in the Jabal al Akhdar region and the two third placed teams in the Benghazi and Sirte regions. The third placed team in the Jabal al Akhdar region played the third placed team in the Benghazi region in a one-off game, whereas the fourth placed team in the Jabal al Akhdar region played the third placed team in the Sirte region in a one-off game.

Final
The winner of these two semi-finals play a one-off game, the winner of which will be promoted to the Libyan Second Division for the 2008-09 season.

The second placed team in the Misrata region (Al Ish'aa') played the second placed team in the Sabha region (Al Qal'aa)

Playoffs

Western Region
Libya Railway 1 - 1 Al Watan al Arabi
Libya Railway 0 - 0 Khalid bin Waleed
Al Watan al Arabi 0 - 0 Khalid bin Waleed
Al Watan al Arabi 0 - 1 Libya Railway
Khalid bin Waleed 4 - 6 Libya Railway
Khalid bin Waleed 1 - 2 Al Watan al Arabi

1: Libya Railway
P3 W2 D1 L0 GF8 GA5 GD+3 Pts7
2: Al Watan al Arabi
P3 W1 D1 L1 GF3 GA3 GD0 Pts4
3: Khalid bin Waleed
P3 W0 D1 L2 GF5 GA8 GD-3 Pts1

Libya Railway won promotion to the Libyan Second Division.

Eastern Section
Al Sadaqa (3rd placed in Jabal al Akhdar region)
Al Manaar Sousah (4th placed in Jabal al Akhdar region)
North Benghazi (3rd placed in Benghazi region)
Al Qal'aa Burayqah (3rd placed in Sirte region)

Semifinals
Both played June 3, 2008
Al Sadaqa 0 - 2  North Benghazi - Ajdabiya Stadium
Al Manaar Sousah 1 - 1 (6 - 7 pens) Al Qal'aa Burayqah - First Statement Stadium

Finals
North Benghazi 3 - 0 Al Qal'aa Burayqah - June 10, 2008 - Derna Stadium (North Benghazi are promoted)

Southern/Western Section
The second placed team in the Sabha section (Al Qal'aa) played the second placed team in the Misrata region (Al Ish'a')

Al Ish'a' 1 - 4 Al Qal'aa - June 6, 2008 - 2 March Stadium (Al Qal'aa are promoted)

Championship stage
The 8 winners of the regional championships were split into two groups of four according to their geographical location. A knockout format was decided upon, meaning that the winner would be eliminated.

Group A
Al Ittihad Gheryan (Tripoli regional champions)
Libya Railway (Zawiya regional champions)
Al Mahdeeya (Sabha regional champions)
Al Dhahra Bani Walid (Misrata regional champions)

Al Mahdeeya 0 - 0 (6 - 7 pens) Al Dhahra Bani Waleed - June 28, 2008, 17:30 EET - 2 March Stadium - Referee: Younes al Sabouni
Al Ittihad Gheryan 1 - 0 Libya Railway - June 28, 2008, 17:30 EET - GMR Stadium - Referee: Ahmed Achour

Group B
Al Hadaf Benghazi (Benghazi regional champions)
Al Ansaar (Jabal al Akhdar regional champions)
Wefaq Ajdabiya (Sirte regional champions)
Al Hilal Tobruk (Butnan regional champions)

Al Hilal Tobruk 0 - 0 (3 - 5 pens) Wefaq Ajdabiya - June 27, 2008, 17:30 EET - Al Bayda Stadium - Referee: Ali 'Ilmi
Al Hadaf Benghazi 2 - 1 Al Ansaar - June 27, 2008, 17:30 EET - First Statement Stadium - Referee: Abdallah al Fadhil

Semifinals
Wefaq Ajdabiya 1 - 1 (5 - 4 pens) Al Hadaf Benghazi - July 6, 2008, 16:00 EET - Al Bayda Stadium
Al Dhahra Bani Waleed 2 - 3 Al Ittihad Gheryan - July 6, 2008 - GMR Stadium

Final
Wefaq Ajdabiya 2 - 1 Al Ittihad Gheryan - July 10, 2008, 17:30 EET - 2 March Stadium

Libyan Third Division
3